Ricardo Maurício (born January 7, 1979) is a Brazilian racing driver. He currently drives in the Stock Car Brasil series, which he won in 2008, 2013 and 2020. Prior to this he raced in several European single-seater formulae, winning the Spanish Formula Three Championship and recording podium finishes in International Formula 3000.

Career

Formula Vauxhall/Opel
Maurício was born in São Paulo. After some time spent kart racing, he moved up to formula racing in Brazil and won the local Formula Ford championship in 1995. For 1996, he moved to Europe, where he competed in Formula Vauxhall, finishing fourth in the championship. At the end of the year he took part in the 1996 EFDA Nations Cup for Formula Opel cars, representing Brazil alongside compatriot Wagner Ebrahim and taking third place.

British Formula 3
For 1997, Maurício drove for the works TOM'S-Toyota team in the British Formula 3 Championship, finishing joint 11th place in the championship with Darren Manning and just behind Kevin McGarrity, the best-placed driver with a TOM'S chassis. At the end of the season he moved to the Alan Docking Racing team to compete in the Macau Grand Prix, but failed to finish the race.

He remained in the championship for 1998, driving an ADR-run Dallara chassis, and improved to seventh place overall, with two podium finishes, well ahead of teammates Yudai Igarashi and Miku Santavirta. However, his performance was overshadowed by his compatriots Mario Haberfeld, Enrique Bernoldi and Luciano Burti, who dominated the championship between them, taking the top three positions in the drivers' standings. He switched to champion team Paul Stewart Racing for the Macau Grand Prix, and finished the race in second place behind Peter Dumbreck.

Formula 3000
Maurício moved up to International Formula 3000 for the 1999 season, driving for Super Nova alongside Jason Watt, but after a difficult start he was dropped after three races in favour of David Saelens. He moved to the Red Bull Junior Team-backed team run by Helmut Marko, replacing Markus Friesacher and partnering Bernoldi. Despite failing to qualify for three of the remaining races in a heavily oversubscribed field of drivers, he scored his first point at the Spa-Francorchamps circuit, placing him 22nd in the championship.

He stayed with the team alongside Bernoldi for 2000, making up for a seven-race run of retirements at the start of the season by securing his first podium finish in the category at the Hungaroring, improving his final championship position to 17th. He was, however, overshadowed somewhat by Bernoldi, who scored just one more point but lost the lead in two races due to mechanical problems.

Maurício began the 2001 season without a drive, despite initially being reconfirmed at the Red Bull Junior Team alongside Patrick Friesacher, who replaced the Formula One-bound Bernoldi. The seat was taken by Antonio García for the first four rounds of the championship, but Maurício resumed it thereafter, becoming a consistent points-scorer on his way to eighth in the championship, including two more podium finishes.

Maurício remained at the team for 2002, but it was a disappointing season for him as he dropped to ninth in the championship, and was consistently outperformed by Friesacher. The highlight of the year was a podium finish in front of his home fans at the Interlagos circuit, where he completed a Brazilian 1-2-3-4 finish with Rodrigo Sperafico, Haberfeld and Antônio Pizzonia. However, he was best remembered for his large crash at Monza, in which his car was launched into a series of aerial rolls after running into the back of Rob Nguyen.

Spanish Formula Three
Dropped by the Red Bull Junior Team and unable to find an F3000 drive, Maurício stepped back to the Spanish Formula Three Championship, where he drove for the Racing Engineering team, initially sponsored by Marlboro. He won the championship, winning six of the thirteen races, ahead of local drivers Daniel Martin, Borja García and Andy Soucek, and comfortably ahead of a succession of six teammates. However, this series was less prestigious than the F3 championships in other countries, and was not enough to advance his formula racing career any further, despite topping a World Series by Renault test session during the winter off-season period.

Stock Car Brasil

For 2004, Maurício returned to Brazil to take part in the Stock Car Brasil championship, a common location for Brazilian ex-single seater drivers. He took part in five races for the Katálogo Racing and Andreas Mattheis Motorsport teams, finishing 23rd in the championship driving a Chevrolet Astra, taking a podium finish and fastest lap in the process. The following year he committed to a full season in the series, driving a similar car run by the L&M Racing team.  Another podium finish and fastest lap saw him improve to 16th in the championship.

Maurício returned to Katálogo for 2006, for whom he drove a Mitsubishi Lancer. He took his first pole position in the series and broke into the top ten in the drivers' standings for the first time. In 2007 he returned to Andreas Mattheis and the Chevrolet Astra in the form of the WA Mattheis team, a new outfit formed by the association of Mattheis and William Lube. He improved to ninth in the championship, taking his first win in the process.

For 2008, WA Mattheis switched cars to the Peugeot 307, which Maurício took to championship victory with five wins from the twelve races, narrowly beating the Astras of Marcos Gomes and Thiago Camilo in the process. It was Peugeot's first championship win in Stock Car Brasil history. In 2009, he moved to the RC Competições team, and once again raced an Astra.  He was unable to successfully defend his championship, losing it to Cacá Bueno.

He remained with RC Competições for 2010, driving a Chevrolet Vectra. He won two races and finished third in the championship, behind teammate Max Wilson and Bueno.

Brazilian GT3
Maurício first competed in the GT3 Brasil Championship in 2009, winning four races for WB Motorsport and finishing fourth in the championship. For 2010, he drove a Lamborghini Gallardo with Bruno Garfinkel for the Scuderia 111 team and finished tenth in the championship.

Other series
Since his move into stock car racing, Maurício has also made occasional appearances in the American World of Outlaws series and the Argentine TC 2000 championship, winning the TC 2000's endurance series cup in 2009.

Racing record

Career summary

† - ineligible for points.

Complete International Formula 3000 results
(key) (Races in bold indicate pole position) (Races in italics indicate fastest lap)

Stock Car Brasil results
(key) (Races in bold indicate pole position) (Races in italics indicate fastest lap)

References

External links

Ricardo Maurício career details at driverdb.com
Stock Car Brasil-based profile at forix.autosport.com

1979 births
Living people
Brazilian racing drivers
Formula Ford drivers
British Formula Three Championship drivers
International Formula 3000 drivers
Euroformula Open Championship drivers
Stock Car Brasil drivers
World of Outlaws drivers
TC 2000 Championship drivers
EFDA Nations Cup drivers
24 Hours of Daytona drivers
Rolex Sports Car Series drivers
Súper TC 2000 drivers
Racing drivers from São Paulo
RSM Marko drivers
TOM'S drivers
Alan Docking Racing drivers
Super Nova Racing drivers
Paul Stewart Racing drivers
Racing Engineering drivers
24H Series drivers